Unicorn mantis is a common name for several species of praying mantis across different genera with horn-like protrusions on their heads including:
Phthersigena unicornis (Timor unicorn mantis)
Phyllovates chlorophaea (Texas unicorn mantis, Mexican unicorn mantis)
Pseudovates arizonae (Arizona unicorn mantis)
Zoolea (Paraguay unicorn mantis, etc.)

See also
List of mantis genera and species

Animal common name disambiguation pages